Prashanth Neelakantapuram (born 4 June 1980) is an Indian film director and screenwriter who primarily works in the Kannada film industry. He made his debut with the 2014 Kannada film, Ugramm and later directed the two-part film series: K.G.F: Chapter 1 (2018), and K.G.F: Chapter 2 (2022), the latter being the highest-grossing Kannada film.

Personal life
Prashanth Neelakantapuram was born on 4 June 1980 in a Telugu family in Karnataka. Born to Subhash and Bharathi, their family hails from Neelakantapuram village, near Madakasira, Andhra Pradesh, and settled in Bangalore. 

Neel married Likhitha in 2010. The couple has a daughter and son. Neel's sister is married to Kannada actor Sriimurali, who eventually starred in Neel's directorial debut Ugramm. Neel is also a cousin of Telugu film actor, Aadarsh Balakrishna, and is also related to former Andhra Pradesh state minister, Raghu Veera Reddy.

Career
In an interview with a Kannada weekly magazine, Neel said he took to filmmaking initially for the need of money, following which he completed a course in the same, eventually developing interest in it. After having completed the course, he decided to cast his brother-in-law and actor Srimurali in Aa Hudugi Neene, a screenplay that he had written during the time. After the latter expressed his concerns due to his inexperience, Neel changed his mind and began observing Srimurali's mannerisms over a period of time, and came up with the project Ugramm, an action film. The film turned out to be a massive commercial success and emerged as one of the highest-grossing Kannada films of 2014.

Reports emerged in late 2014 and early 2015 of Neel having been signed to direct three films. The first is a sequel to Ugramm, entitled Ugramm Veeram, which would feature Srimurali reprise his role from Ugramm.  His next film KGF which stands for Kolar Gold Fields presented Yash in the role of Rocky, an orphan who becomes a don. The sequel KGF: Chapter 2, was scheduled for a theatrical release on 16 July 2021, but was delayed due to the second wave of the COVID pandemic in India.

On 2 December 2020, Hombale Films announced the film Salaar with Prabhas. The film's shoot began on 29 January 2021. In May 2021, Mythri Movie Makers and N.T.R. Arts have announced a film in collaboration with Neel and Jr. NTR, for his 31st film. The film is expected to begin its production in April 2023.
He also signed a project with Producer Dil Raju , starring Prabhas, his second collaboration with him, titled Ravanam.

Filmography

Awards and nominations

References

External links
 
 

1980 births
Living people
Telugu people
Telugu film directors
Telugu screenwriters
Kannada film directors
Film directors from Bangalore
Screenwriters from Bangalore
21st-century Indian film directors
South Indian International Movie Awards winners